Group Captain Adebayo Hamed Lawal (born 14 September 1941) was Governor of Benue State, Nigeria from July 1978 to October 1979 during the military regime of General Olusegun Obasanjo.

Adebayo Hamed Lawal was born on September 14, 1941, in Offa, Kwara State. He attended Government College, Ibadan (1955–1962). He enlisted in the Nigerian Airforce in 1963 and was trained as a Military Pilot in West Germany, graduating in 1964. 
Postings included Commander, Port Harcourt Base (1969–1970), Commander Kano Base (1972–1973) and (1975–1977) and Commander,
Makurdi Base (1977–1978).

He was appointed Military Governor of Benue State in July 1978, holding the position until October 1979.
He oversaw the peaceful transition from military rule to civil rule, handing over power to the National Party of Nigeria candidate Aper Aku on 1 October 1979.

References

1941 births
Living people
Nigerian Muslims
Nigerian military personnel
Yoruba military personnel
Governors of Benue State
People from Kwara State
Nigerian Air Force officers
Yoruba people